The John Motheral House is a property in Franklin, Tennessee that dates from c.1805, was enlarged c.1870, and was listed on the National Register of Historic Places in 1988.

It was built as a log building in c.1805, probably of single pen construction, and was enlarged c.1870 to have an "imposing" two story frame construction.  Other Williamson County structures that were enlarged in this way, in approximately the same time period, include the Sherwood Green House and the William Leaton House.

References

Houses on the National Register of Historic Places in Tennessee
Houses in Franklin, Tennessee
Houses completed in 1805
Houses completed in 1870
1805 establishments in Tennessee
National Register of Historic Places in Williamson County, Tennessee